Khodashah (also Romanized as Khodāshāh; also known as Deh Emām) is a village in Miyan Jovin Rural District, Helali District, Joghatai County, Razavi Khorasan Province, Iran. At the 2006 census, its population was 1,753, in 398 families.

References 

Populated places in Joghatai County